Llanfalteg Halt railway station served the village of Llanfallteg, Carmarthenshire, Wales, from 1875 to 1962 on the Whitland and Cardigan Railway.

History 
The station was opened on 12 July 1875 by the Whitland and Taf Vale Railway. The original station had a wooden shed as a station building. Nearby was a stone-built engine shed which had space for one engine. This closed on 1 September 1886. A new station was built in 1886. This had a goods shed opposite the platform; access was granted by a ground frame in a wooden cabin. Near the level crossing was a siding that served another goods shed built from cast iron. On the platform was a station building that incorporated the waiting room and the booking shed. The station was downgraded to a halt in September 1956, thus the suffix 'Halt' was added to its name. It closed on 10 September 1962. The station building was demolished in 1968.

References 

Disused railway stations in Carmarthenshire
Railway stations in Great Britain opened in 1875
Railway stations in Great Britain closed in 1962
1875 establishments in Wales
1962 disestablishments in Wales